"UFO" is the fifth single by Australian dance group Sneaky Sound System, taken from their self-titled debut album Sneaky Sound System (2006). It peaked at #11 on the ARIA Singles Chart. The song was certified Platinum in Australia, with sales of 70,000.

At the AIR Awards of 2007, it won Best Performing Independent Single / EP.

It was released as the second UK single, taken from their self-titled UK compilation album Sneaky Sound System (2009).

Track listing
Australian CD single
 "UFO (Radio Edit)" – 3:46
 "UFO (Extended Club Mix)" – 6:24
 "UFO (Van She Tech Remix)" – 4:45
 "UFO (Donnie Sloan Remix)" – 5:04
 "UFO (A Capella)" – 5:01

Remixes
Sneaky Sound System Mixes
 “UFO (Radio Edit)” - 3:45
 “UFO (Album Version/Video Edit)” - 4:29
 "UFO (Extended Club Mix)" – 6:24
 “UFO (Acapella)” - 5:00
 “UFO (UK Radio Mix)” - 3:45
 “UFO (UK Album Version)” - 4:03
 "UFO (12" Super Extended Mix)" – 6:00
Bimbo Jones Mixes
 "UFO (Bimbo Jones Club Mix)" – 7:56
 "UFO (Bimbo Jones Twist Mix)" – 7:53
 "UFO (Bimbo Jones Twist Dub)" – 7:53
Van She Mix
 "UFO (Van She Tech Remix)" – 4:45
Donnie Sloan Mix
 "UFO (Donnie Sloan Remix)" – 5:04
Will Crate Mix
 "UFO (Goodwill Mix)" – 7:34

Personnel
 Black Angus – all instruments, producer
 Felix Bloxsom – live drums
 Miss Connie – vocals
 Peter Dolso – all instruments, producer, engineer, mix
 Donnie Sloan –  remix and additional production
 Van She Tech –  remix and additional production

Charts

Release history

External links
 Australian CD single on Waterfront Records

References

Sneaky Sound System songs
2006 songs
2007 singles
2008 singles
Songs written by Connie Mitchell
14th Floor Records singles